The Péan monoplane was a French experimental aircraft built in the late 1900s.

Specifications

References

Further reading

Single-engined tractor aircraft
Aircraft first flown in 1908